USS Recruit (TDE-1, later TFFG-1) was a landlocked "dummy" training ship of the United States Navy, located at the Naval Training Center in the Point Loma area of San Diego. She was built to scale, two-thirds the size of a  destroyer escort, and was commissioned on July 27, 1949. Recruit was commissioned for 18 years, for much of that period the only landlocked ship to hold that status in the U.S. Navy.

Background
In 1919, Naval Training Station San Diego was established, through the efforts of Representative William Kettner to have the navy relocate recruit training from Goat Island to San Diego.
Her predecessor , a wooden "battleship" built in Union Square in New York City in 1917, was dismantled in 1920. During World War II, there was a minesweeper named , which was in commissioned in 1943, decommissioned in 1946, and was ultimately transferred to the Mexican Navy.

Naval Training Center San Diego

Designed to be a two-thirds scale replica of a destroyer escort, her construction began in 1949. That same year, the Recruit was commissioned by Rear Admiral Wilder D. Baker. "Sailing" on a sea of concrete at the Naval Training Center, she assisted with the training of over 50,000 new recruits per year, providing an education in the fundamentals of shipboard drills and procedures, using standard deck and bridge gear like that found on all naval vessels, including lifelines, accommodation ladders, signal halyards, searchlights, the engine order telegraph and the helm. Below decks, the ship had six classrooms where recruits were training, and adjacent to the ship were barracks where those recruits would be housed when not standing watches aboard the Recruit. However, due to her landlocked status, Recruit lacked an engine or screw, and therefore was affectionately nicknamed the "USS Neversail." In 1954, she was modified from her original configuration. Reflecting her dual identity as both a ship and a building, she was also known as Building 430, located on Geary Drive between Evans and Chauncey roads.

Recruit was decommissioned in March 1967, due to the inability to classify the unique ship in a computerized registry of Navy vessels. She was later reconditioned in 1982, and refurbished to look like an Oliver Hazard Perry-class frigate, this reconditioning extended the ship's length to 233 feet; that same year she was recommissioned. Commissioned or otherwise, she served continuously as a training facility from her construction in 1949 until the base was closed by the BRAC commission in 1997.

Liberty Station

The Recruit still stands, currently unused, with the hope that she will someday become a maritime museum. Maintenance became the responsibility for a private company placed in charge of repurposing the former training center. In July 2001, Naval Training Center was listed in the National Register of Historic Places; the Recruit is included in the Naval Training Center's listing. In 2004, she was listed as a California Historical Landmark. In 2014, partnering with the USS Midway Museum, the Recruit was refurbished. The San Diego chapter of E Clampus Vitus also assisted with the renovation. She remains were she was built, is adjacent to a retail area of Liberty Station, as the redeveloped base is known, and can be seen from North Harbor Drive. A conference building and several hotels are also located nearby.

She appears to be the one of two surviving examples of the Navy's landlocked ships, or "landships". At Recruit Training Command, Great Lakes, Illinois, there is the USS Trayer (BST-21), used for the battle stations phase of recruit training.  The , located at the United States Naval Training Center Bainbridge in Maryland, was dismantled when the base closed in the 1970s. The , located at Naval Training Center Orlando in Florida, was also dismantled when this base closed March 31, 1995. , plans to make the Recruit into a museum ship have not yet been successful.

In media
The USS Recruit is featured in the opening credits of the 1976 television sitcom CPO Sharkey which takes place in San Diego.

Notes

References

Buildings and structures in San Diego
Landmarks in San Diego
Buildings of the United States Navy
Landlocked ships
Training ships of the United States Navy
1949 ships
California Historical Landmarks
1949 establishments in California
Closed installations of the United States Navy